Thomas Newton (1704–1782) was an English cleric, biblical scholar and author.

Thomas Newton may also refer to:

Thomas Newton (poet) (c. 1542–1607), English physician, poet and translator
Thomas Newton Jr. (1768–1847), American politician
Thomas Willoughby Newton (1804–1853), Whig member of the United States House of Representatives from the State of Arkansas
Thomas Newton (footballer), English football goalkeeper
Thomas Walter Francis Newton, English architect
Thomas Jerome Newton (disambiguation), for various characters